The 2004 WGC-American Express Championship was a golf tournament that was contested from 30 September to 3 October 2004 at Mount Juliet Golf Course in Thomastown, Kilkenny, Ireland. It was the fifth WGC-American Express Championship tournament and the third of three World Golf Championships events held in 2004.

Ernie Els won the tournament for his first of two WGC titles, which lifted him to second in the Official World Golf Ranking.  Tiger Woods was the 2-time defending champion but finished in 9th place.

Round summaries

First round

Second round

Third round

Final leaderboard

External links
Full results

WGC Championship
Golf tournaments in the Republic of Ireland
Golf in Leinster
Sport in County Kilkenny
WGC-American Express Championship
WGC-American Express Championship
WGC-American Express Championship
WGC-American Express Championship